Merlin Atmos: Live Performances 2013 is a live album by English progressive rock band Van der Graaf Generator, released in February 2015. The album was recorded during the band's European tour in June 2013 and includes a full onstage performance of the suite "A Plague of Lighthouse Keepers", originally recorded for Pawn Hearts in 1971.

In addition to the regular version of the album, a special edition containing an extra CD called "Bonus Atmos" and a vinyl version including just the two long suites ("Flight" and "A Plague of Lighthouse Keepers") were also issued.

Track listing 

All tracks written by Peter Hammill except where noted.

Regular album

Bonus Atmos 

(*) Peter Hammill solo album.

Vinyl

Personnel 
Van der Graaf Generator 
 Peter Hammill – vocals, guitar, keyboards
 Hugh Banton – organ, bass pedals
 Guy Evans – drums

References

External links 
 Van der Graaf Generator - Merlin Atmos: Live Performances 2013 (2015) album review, credits & releases at AllMusic.com
 Van der Graaf Generator - Merlin Atmos: Live Performances 2013 (2015) album releases & credits at Discogs.com
 Van der Graaf Generator - Merlin Atmos: Live Performances 2013 (2015) album credits & user reviews at ProgArchives.com
 Van der Graaf Generator - Merlin Atmos: Live Performances 2013 (2015) album to be listened as stream at Spotify.com

Van der Graaf Generator albums
Live progressive rock albums
2015 live albums